Absolute return is a financial term used for measuring the gain or loss on an investment portfolio.

Absolute return may also refer to:

Absolute Return + Alpha, a magazine about hedge funds
Absolute Return for Kids, a charitable organization based in the United Kingdom
Absolute Return Capital, an affiliate of the investment firm Bain Trust
Absolute Return Trust, a British investment trust